The 2013 South Australian National Football League season was the 134th season of the top-level Australian rules football competition in South Australia.

The season opened on 28 March with the opening fixture between West Adelaide and Central District, and concluded on 6 October with the Grand Final, in which minor premiers  went on to record its 29th premiership, defeating  by 40 points.

Premiership season

Round 1

Round 2

Round 3

Round 4

Round 5

Round 6

Round 7

Round 8

Round 9

Round 10

Round 11

Round 12

Round 13

Round 14

Round 15

Round 16

Round 17

Round 18

Round 19

Round 20

Round 21

Round 22

Round 23

Ladder

Finals series

Week 1

Week 2

Week 3

Week 4 (2013 SANFL Grand Final)

Club Performances

Best and fairest

Ken Farmer Medal

The Ken Farmer Medal is awarded to the SANFL's leading goal scorer during the home and away season.

Current clubs

References

South Australian National Football League seasons
SANFL